"Somewhere Inside" is a song recorded by Canadian country music artist Chris Cummings. It was released in 1996 as the third single from his debut album, Somewhere Inside. It peaked at number 4 on the RPM Country Tracks chart in January 1997.

Content
The narrator comes across a box of items that were left behind from a former lover. While looking at them, the narrator says that although his lover is gone, she's still with him somewhere inside.

Chart performance

Year-end charts

References

1996 songs
1996 singles
Chris Cummings songs
Warner Music Group singles
Song recordings produced by Jim Ed Norman
Songs written by Chris Cummings